Lake Corella is a concrete faced rockfill dam on the Corella River built between 1956 and 1957 to provide town water for the Mary Kathleen Uranium Mine. The dam originally had a gated control structure which was removed in 2004, lowering the spillway and reducing the full supply level. When full it has a surface area of 200 hectares and holds 10,500 ML of water.

Clem Walton Park is a popular camping area on the shore of the lake.

See also

List of dams and reservoirs in Australia

Corella Lake
North West Queensland
Dams completed in 1959
Dams in Queensland